The  was held on 22 January 1995 in Kannai Hall, Yokohama, Kanagawa, Japan.

Awards
 Best Film: Tokarefu
 Best Film Score: Shigeru Umebayashi – Tokarefu, Ghost Pub
 Best Actor: Eiji Okuda – Like a Rolling Stone
 Best Actress: Saki Takaoka – Crest of Betrayal
 Best Supporting Actor: Kōichi Satō – Tokarefu
 Best Supporting Actress: Shigeru Muroi – Ghost Pub
 Best Director: Junji Sakamoto – Tokarefu
 Best New Director: Takeshi Watanabe – Kyōjū Luger P08
 Best Screenplay: Yōzō Tanaka – Ghost Pub, Natsu no Niwa: The Friends
 Best Cinematography: Norimichi Kasamatsu – Yoru ga Mata Kuru, Angel Guts: Red Lightning, Angel Dust
 Best New Talent:
Shunsuke Matsuoka – 800 Two Lap Runners
Hinako Saeki – It's a Summer Vacation Everyday
Yui Natsukawa – Yoru ga Mata Kuru
 Special Prize: Azuma Morisaki – For his work.

Best 10
 Tokarefu
 Ghost Pub
 Crest of Betrayal
 800 Two Lap Runners
 Like a Rolling Stone
 119
 Nūdo no Yoru
 Natsu no Niwa: The Friends
 A Dedicated Life
 Yoru Ga Mata Kuru
runner-up. Kyōjū Luger P08

References

Yokohama Film Festival
1995 film festivals
1995 in Japanese cinema
Yoko
January 1995 events in Asia